Aruba elects a legislature on the national level. The Estates (Staten) have 21 members, elected for a four-year term by Open list Party-list proportional representation. Seats are distributed between parties that have gained at least one full quota (1/21, or approximately 4.76% of the vote) using the Hagenbach-Bischoff system (a variant of the D'Hondt method). Before obtaining the status as land ( in the Kingdom of the Netherlands, Aruba participated in elections for its Island Council and for the Aruba constituency of the parliament of the Netherlands Antilles.

Aruba has a multi-party system, with two or three strong parties and a third party that is electorally successful.

Latest elections

See also
Electoral calendar
Electoral system

References

 
Aruba